Sorkhi (also Romanized as Sorkhī) is a village in Tudeshk Rural District, Kuhpayeh District, Isfahan County, Isfahan Province, Iran. At the 2006 census, its population was 22, in 6 families.

References 

Populated places in Isfahan County